Vyacheslav Aleksandrovich Belov (25 February 1938 – 9 December 2010) was a Soviet modern pentathlon competitor, who won two team medals at the world championships of 1969–70. A Colonel with the Soviet Militsiya, he took part in the cleanup operation after the Chernobyl disaster. He was married to the Russian Olympic fencer Elena Belova.

References

1938 births
2010 deaths
Soviet male modern pentathletes
World Modern Pentathlon Championships medalists